Albert Paone (born c. 1942) is a former American football player and coach of football, baseball, and wrestling. He served as the head football coach at Simpson College in Indianola, Iowa from 1971 to 1973, compiling a record of 9–15–3.  Paonoe was also the head baseball coach at Simpson for one season, in 1969, tallying a mark of 6–12. He played a single season of professional football for the Des Moines Warriors of the Professional Football League of America.

A native of Alliance, Ohio, Paone graduated from Simpson College in 1966. He was an assistant football coach and head wrestling coach at Dowling Catholic High School in West Des Moines, Iowa from 1966 until 1969, when he returned to Simpson as defensive coordinator for the football team under head coach John Sullivan. Paone was as an assistant football coach at Colorado State University from 1975 to 1976.

Head coaching record

College football

References

Year of birth missing (living people)
1940s births
Living people
American football linebackers
Colorado State Rams football coaches
Simpson Storm baseball coaches
Simpson Storm football coaches
Simpson Storm football players
High school football coaches in Iowa
High school wrestling coaches in the United States
People from Alliance, Ohio
Players of American football from Ohio